Nikola Nemešević (born 18 November 1988), better known by his stage name Nemeš, is a Serbian singer-songwriter and media personality.

Biography

Personal life
Nemeš was born in Požarevac, Serbia to father Vojislav and mother Nada. He became known to wider audience in Balkans as the contestant of Big Brother.

Career

Early beginnings
Nemeš started playing piano and keyboards with several bands while he was still in high school. One of the bands he continued working with is a pop-rock band called Bad Choice.

Classical education and opera
After graduating music high school in Požarevac, he enrolled in the University of Arts in Belgrade where he studied and graduated in Opera singing. His singing professors were primadona Radmila Smiljanić and Nikola Mijailović (singer). He took part in several international opera festivals, including Oper Oder-Spree in Beeskow, Germany and International Summer Music School Pučišća, Croatia.

2011: Znam taj smešak

In 2011. Nemeš released his first single called "Znam taj smešak". In less than a month, due to his participation in Big Brother and media exposure, the song gained over 3 million YouTube views.

Current bands
He is currently performing with his band called Tregeri. Their repertoire is based on evergreen, jazz and swing music.

Collaborations
In 2011. he worked with DJ/Producer Ivan Schwartz on a remake version of "Apsolutno Tvoj", song originally sung by band "Mirzino Jato".

In 2014. he wrote and recorded a cheering anthem called "Idemo BRE", written for National Basketball Team of Serbia in collaboration with Marko Kon.

Media and TV

Dancing With the Stars
In 2014. Nemeš was one of participants in Serbian version of Dancing With the Stars. He remained in the competition for 5 weeks.

Men's Health
In 2010. he was featured on the cover of Men's health magazine, after he won the Men's health fitness challenge.

Radio
In 2017. he started working on the TDI Radio Belgrade

References

External links
 Nemeš – Official Facebook Page

21st-century Serbian male singers
1988 births
Living people
Musicians from Požarevac